The Moorish Mosque, Kapurthala situated in Kapurthala in the Indian State of Punjab is patterned on the lines of the Grand Mosque of Marrakesh, Morocco. It was commissioned by Maharajah Jagatjit Singh, the last ruler of Kapurthala. Kapurthala city, was then the capital city of the Kapurthala State, known as 'Mini Paris of Punjab' and the mosque was stated to be one of the best in South-east Asia. The mosque is a national monument protected by the Archaeological Survey of India.

Location

History
The mosque was built by Maharaja Jagatjit Singh, the last ruler of Kapurthala. He was ruler with extravagant tastes but known for the developmental activities implemented in the then Kapurthala State. He was renowned for his secular credentials. The Maharaja, a Sikh, who built it, believed in catering to the aspirations of his largely Muslim subjects (about 60%). The mosque was his ambitious effort to promote social integration among his people, and this is proved by the fact that when the then Viceroy of India sent him a letter questioning him on the large costs involved in building it, the Maharaja replied: "Your Excellency may be unaware that 60 per cent of my population  my loyal Muslim subjects. It is only in the fitness of things that the best place of worship in my state be constructed for them".

The mosque was built to the architectural design of the French architect Monsieur M. Manteaux, who had also designed the Jagatjit Palace in the city. Construction was started in 1927 and completed in 1930 and built at a cost of Rs 600,000. The mosque was inaugurated by Nawab Sadeq Mohammad Khan V, the Nawab of Bhawalpur. An inscription on the mosque also states that it was built in a period of four years.

Features

The mosque's architectural design is a replication of the Koutoubia Mosque in Marrakesh in Morocco. The art work of the inner dome is attributed to the artists of the Mayo School of Art, Lahore. Architecturally  the mosque is very elegant and is built with marble stones. Its uniqueness lies in the fact that unlike other mosques in India it is built without any external domes or minarets but  has a tall tower at one end of the edifice. The mosque's inner courtyard is paved entirely with marble, and has a unique design. 
Glass panes have been fitted in the arched sections of the doors, windows and other artistic feature. Wooden grills are provided in the interior while latticed iron work  form the external features. The mosque is painted in light red colour. However, the doors and windows and eves are painted in green colour. In the interior of the mosque, the wooden ceiling is varnished in black and red colours.

A model of the mosque was designed by Monsier Mantout and was exquisitely crafted in wood. This was presented to Mantout by the Maharaja on 14 March 1930.

Restoration
In 1972, as part of the operation "city beautification" programme initiated by the state government at the suggestion of then Prime Minister of India, Indira Gandhi, the mosque was cleaned up and a rose garden laid in its front lawn. The mosque is now in a rundown condition with growth of wild grass in its back yards. The garden is also in a neglected state. The last time some renovation was done on the mosque was when APJ Abdul Kalam, President of India visited the mosque, in late 2013, to offer prayers. The status of the mosque was studied by the Archaeological Survey of India to assess the extent of renovation required in the mosque. A Detailed Project report was to be prepared identifying required renovations.

Gallery

References

Bibliography
 

Kapurthala
20th-century mosques
Moorish Revival architecture
Mosques in Punjab, India
Mosques completed in 1930